Frezza is an Italian surname. Notable people with the surname include:

Alberto Frezza (born 1989), Italian–American actor
Fortunato Frezza (born 1942), Italian Roman Catholic priest
Giammarco Frezza (born 1975), Italian footballer
Giovanni Frezza (born 1972), Italian actor
Giovanni Girolamo Frezza (1659–1730), Italian engraver
Orazio Frezza (fl. 17th c.), Italian Baroque painter

Italian-language surnames